Koretište (erroneously Kuretište (Куретиште)) or Koretishti, is a village in the municipality of Gjilan in Kosovo. It is inhabited by majority of ethnic Serbs.

History
The village was mentioned as Karanište in the Ottoman defter of 1455 of the Vlk Vilayet (Vilayet of Vuk), encompassing most of Vuk Branković's former territory. At that time the village was populated with a priest and 14 households. 

On the Austrian map from 1689, it is registered under the name Koretište.

See also
Populated places in Kosovo

Notes and references 

Notes:

References:

External links
Koretište (Serbian Cyrillic: Коретиште) – video from the air (2017):
video on Facebook facebook.com
video on YouTube youtube.com

Villages in Gjilan
Serbian enclaves in Kosovo